Fort Depuy, located in Shawnee on Delaware, is a village in Smithfield Township. It was one of many forts in Colonial Pennsylvania built in 1755 and 1756 during the French and Indian War.

The need for fortifications.

In response to an increasing number of attacks in Pennsylvania by French troops in the western part of the state and by Indian hostilities close to Philadelphia, the Pennsylvania Legislature placed Benjamin Franklin and James Hamilton in charge to erect a chain of forts along the Blue Mountain (Pennsylvania).

Franklin, via a letter dated January 12, 1756 to Captain James Van Etten, ordered him to "proceed immediately to raise a Company of Foot, consisting of 30 able Men, including two Serjeants, with which you are to protect the Inhabitants of Upper Smithfield assisting them while they thresh out and secure their Corn, and scouting from time to time as you judge necessary on the Outside of the Settlements."

Origin of the name

The Fort was established on the farm of Nicholas Depuy, the first white settler of the area who arrived in 1727 and purchased 3,000 acres. In 1755 Franklin insisted that the Depuy home, because of its strategic location along the Delaware River, be commandeered to serve as a fort.

Structure and history

Fort Depuy was constructed in the shape of a square with guns at each corner. The fort also served as a commissary base for the other forts in the area.

After 1763 the Fort was returned to the family and returned to its function as a farm.

The Shawnee Inn & Golf Resort is located on the site of Depuy's farm and the former Fort.

See also
 Province of Pennsylvania
 Shawnee on Delaware

References 

Depuy
Depuy
Depuy
Benjamin Franklin